John Klein could refer to: 

John Klein (soccer) (born 1965), American soccer player and coach
John Klein (rugby league) (born 1952), Australian rugby league footballer
Johnny Klein (1918–1997), American musician

See also
John Kline (disambiguation)